Hayze Perham (born 2 July 1999) is a New Zealand professional rugby league footballer who plays as a  and  for the Canterbury-Bankstown Bulldogs in the NRL.

He previously played for the New Zealand Warriors and the Parramatta Eels in the National Rugby League.

Background
Perham was born in Taupo, New Zealand and is of Maori descent.

Early life
Perham played rugby league and rugby union at Rotorua Boys' High School.

Career

2019
In round 7 of the 2019 NRL season, Perham made his first grade debut for the New Zealand Warriors against Melbourne at AAMI Park.

2020
In round 17 of the 2020 NRL season, Perham scored his first try in a  24-18 loss against the Parramatta Eels. Perham was released from his contract with the New Zealand Warriors, signing with Parramatta for the 2021 NRL season.

2021
In round 25 of the 2021 NRL season, he made his club debut for Parramatta in a 40-6 loss against Penrith.

2022
In round 7 of the 2022 NRL season, he scored his first try for Parramatta in their 39-2 victory over Newcastle.
In November, Perham signed a contract to join Parramatta's arch-rivals Canterbury ahead of the 2023 NRL season.

References

External links
Parramatta Eels profile
New Zealand Warriors profile

1999 births
Living people
New Zealand rugby league players
New Zealand Māori rugby league players
New Zealand Warriors players
Parramatta Eels players
Canterbury-Bankstown Bulldogs players
Junior Kiwis players
Rugby league five-eighths
Sportspeople from Taupō
Rugby league players from Waikato